Michelle O'Neill (née Doris; born 10 January 1977) is an Irish politician who served as deputy First Minister of Northern Ireland between 2020 and 2022. She has been serving as Vice President of Sinn Féin since 2018 and is the Member of the Legislative Assembly (MLA) for Mid Ulster since 2007.

O'Neill served on the Dungannon and South Tyrone Borough Council from 2005 to 2011. She served as the first female Mayor of Dungannon and South Tyrone from 2010 to 2011. In 2007, she was elected to represent Mid Ulster in the Northern Ireland Assembly. In 2011, she was appointed to the Northern Ireland Executive by deputy First Minister Martin McGuinness as Minister for Agriculture and Rural Development. In 2016, she was promoted to Minister of Health. In January 2020, she became deputy First Minister of Northern Ireland after the New Decade, New Approach agreement restored the power-sharing executive.

O'Neill automatically relinquished her office following Paul Givan's resignation as first minister on 3 February 2022. Sinn Féin became the largest party after the 2022 Assembly election, putting O'Neill in line for the position of First Minister of Northern Ireland, however she has not taken up the position because the DUP has refused to nominate a deputy First Minister, citing its opposition to the Northern Ireland Protocol.

Background
O'Neill was born in Fermoy, County Cork, Republic of Ireland. She comes from an Irish republican family in Clonoe, County Tyrone, Northern Ireland. Her father Brendan Doris was a Provisional IRA prisoner and Sinn Féin councillor. Her uncle Paul Doris is a former national president of the Irish Northern Aid Committee (NORAID). A cousin, Tony Doris, was one of three IRA members killed in an ambush by the Special Air Service in 1991. Another cousin, IRA volunteer Gareth Malachy Doris, was shot and wounded during the 1997 Coalisland attack.

After the death of Brendan Doris in 2006, Martin McGuinness paid tribute to the Doris family as "a well-known and respected republican family [who] have played a significant role in the republican struggle for many years".

O'Neill attended St. Patrick's Girls' Academy, a Catholic grammar school in Dungannon, Tyrone. She subsequently began to train as an accounting technician, before pursuing a political career.

Political career

Early career
O'Neill became involved in republican politics in her teens, assisting her father with constituency work in his role as a Dungannon councillor. She joined Sinn Féin after the Good Friday Agreement in 1998, at the age of 21, and started working as an advisor to Francie Molloy in the Northern Ireland Assembly. She kept this role until 2005, when she was elected to represent the Torrent electoral area on Dungannon and South Tyrone Borough Council, taking the seat which had been vacated by her father. O'Neill was elected as an MLA for Mid Ulster in the 2007 Assembly election, succeeding her Sinn Féin colleague Geraldine Dougan. While a backbencher in the Assembly, she sat on Stormont's education and health committees. In 2010, she became Mayor of Dungannon and South Tyrone. O'Neill was the first woman to hold the position of Mayor, as well as one of the youngest people. She held the council position until 2011.

Minister for Agriculture and Rural Development 
O'Neill succeeded Michelle Gildernew as Minister for Agriculture and Rural Development in the Northern Ireland Executive after the 2011 Assembly election. One of her key decisions in the role was the relocation of the Department of Agriculture and Rural Development's headquarters from Belfast to a former British Army barracks in Ballykelly, County Londonderry in a bid to decentralise civil service jobs. The decision overruled an internal report on the matter, which recommended Strabane as a more appropriate location.

In December 2013, the High Court quashed a decision by O'Neill to reallocate 7% of Common Agricultural Policy funds to rural development projects that had been favoured by environmentalists. The court ruled that she was in breach of the Ministerial Code, having not sought the necessary permissions for the transfer from the Executive.

Minister of Health 
O'Neill replaced the Democratic Unionist Party's Simon Hamilton as Minister of Health following the 2016 election. After just eight days in office, she announced she would be scrapping the lifetime ban on gay and bisexual men donating blood in Northern Ireland. On 25 October 2016, O'Neill unveiled a document titled Health and Wellbeing 2026: Delivering Together, a ten-year plan which is based on the findings of the Bengoa Report and aims to modernise the health and social care system.

Vice President of Sinn Féin

In January 2017, when Martin McGuinness resigned as deputy First Minister in protest against the Renewable Heat Incentive scandal, and said that he would not stand in the resulting snap election, O'Neill was chosen as Sinn Féin's new "party leader in the North". The fact that she was favoured for the leadership ahead of former IRA member Conor Murphy marked a notable break in the leadership's direct association with the organisation.

In the 2017 Assembly election that followed McGuinness's resignation, O'Neill was returned to the Assembly, topping the poll in Mid Ulster and with a 20.6% share of first-preference votes. In March 2017, she called for a referendum on the reunification of Ireland "as soon as possible" in response to Brexit. O'Neill led the Sinn Féin side in the inter-party negotiations that followed the election, aiming to restore a power-sharing coalition in Northern Ireland, but said at the end of March that the talks had failed, and Sinn Féin would not nominate her for the position of deputy First Minister.

In February 2018, O'Neill became vice president of Sinn Féin, succeeding Mary Lou McDonald, who became president following the retirement of Gerry Adams. In November 2019 she faced a leadership challenge from John O'Dowd, winning with 67% of the vote.

Deputy First Minister
 
In January 2020, O'Neill was appointed deputy First Minister of Northern Ireland. She automatically lost her position on 14 June 2021 when Arlene Foster resigned as First Minister, and regained it three days later when she and Paul Givan were nominated as deputy First Minister and First Minister respectively on 17 June 2021. In February 2022, O'Neill once again lost her position as deputy First Minister with the resignation of Paul Givan as First Minister.

First Minister (Designate)

Following the 2022 Assembly election, Sinn Féin won the largest number of seats with 27 seats, becoming the largest political party in the Northern Ireland Assembly. Their unionist counterparts, the Democratic Unionist Party (DUP) came second with 25 seats. As a result of being the largest party, this puts O'Neill in line to become the First Minister of Northern Ireland, and the DUP leader to become the deputy First Minister of Northern Ireland. However, O'Neill remains to be officially sworn in as First Minister because, as part of its opposition to the Northern Ireland Protocol, the DUP has refused to nominate a deputy First minister and there is therefore no functioning executive of Northern Ireland.

Personal life 
O'Neill became pregnant at the age of 16. She married Paddy O'Neill when she was 18. Together they have two children. They separated in 2014.

Electoral history 
Northern Ireland Assembly elections

Notes

References

External links
 

|-

|-

|-

|-

1977 births
Living people
Female members of the Northern Ireland Assembly
LGBT rights activists from Northern Ireland
Ministers of the Northern Ireland Executive (since 1999)
Northern Ireland MLAs 2007–2011
Northern Ireland MLAs 2011–2016
Northern Ireland MLAs 2016–2017
Northern Ireland MLAs 2017–2022
Northern Ireland MLAs 2022–2027
People from Fermoy
Sinn Féin MLAs
Women ministers of the Northern Ireland Executive
Sinn Féin councillors in Northern Ireland
Members of Dungannon and South Tyrone Borough Council
Female heads of government in the United Kingdom
Women councillors in Northern Ireland
Women activists from Northern Ireland